Olga Sergeyevna Akopyan (née Levina on 4 March 1985) is a retired Russian handball player who last played for Lada Togliatti and the Russian national handball team. She won the world title in 2007 and 2009 and an Olympic gold medal in 2016, placing eighth in 2012.

After the 2012 Olympics she married Eduard Akopyan, and in 2013 gave birth to a daughter Arina. She returned to training in November 2013.

She is currently the head coach for CSKA Moscow in the Russian Super League and the assistant coach in the Russia women's national handball team.

References

1985 births
Russian female handball players
Living people
Handball players at the 2012 Summer Olympics
Handball players at the 2016 Summer Olympics
Sportspeople from Volgograd
Olympic medalists in handball
Olympic handball players of Russia
Olympic gold medalists for Russia
Medalists at the 2016 Summer Olympics